Roger Federer was the defending champion, but chose not to participate this year.

Matteo Berrettini won the title, defeating Félix Auger-Aliassime in the final, 6–4, 7–6(13-11). Berrettini did not lose serve through 50 service games in the tournament.

Seeds
The top four seeds receive a bye into the second round.

Draw

Finals

Top half

Bottom half

Qualifying

Seeds

Qualifiers

Qualifying draw

First qualifier

Second qualifier

Third qualifier

Fourth qualifier

References

External links
 Main draw
 Qualifying draw

2019 ATP Tour
2019 Singles